Rawhide Buttes [el. ] is a mountain range in Wyoming.

According to tradition, Rawhide Buttes was so named on account of a pioneer being skinned by Native Americans (Indians) there.

References

Landforms of Goshen County, Wyoming
Mountain ranges of Wyoming